The second album by Canadian indie rock band Wintersleep is untitled.  It was released February 15, 2005 on Dependent Music.

The CD contains a hidden track called "Spring".  The song can be heard by 'rewinding' the first track of the CD, as it is found in the pregap of the first track.

In 2006, Jud Haynes and James Mejia, who did the artwork for the album, were nominated for a Juno in the category of "CD/DVD Artwork Design of the Year".

Track listing
All songs were written by Wintersleep.

Hidden Tracks:
"Spring"
"Damage"

Personnel
Stephanie Bell – enhanced CD audio creation
Loel Campbell – performer, group member
Laurence Currie – producer, engineer, mixing
Tim D'Eon – performer, group member
Jud Haynes – booklet, group member
Roger Lian – mastering
James Mejia – collage
Paul Murphy – performer, group member
Darren Van Niekerk – assistant
Wintersleep – producer

References

2005 albums
Wintersleep albums